Aramis is one of the title characters in the novel The Three Musketeers by Alexandre Dumas, père.

Aramis may also refer to:

Aramis (personal rapid transit), personal rapid transit test project run by Matra in the 1980s in Paris
Aramis, or the Love of Technology, a book about the transit project by Bruno Latour
Aramis (horse), a show jumper who competed in the 1984 Olympics
Aramis (fragrance), produced by Estée Lauder Inc.
USS Aramis
a variety of hops grown in France

Places
Aramis, Ethiopia, where fossil of Australopithecus afarensis have been found
Aramis Range, a mountain range in Antarctica
Yeremes, Armenia, also called Aramis

People
Aramis (wrestler), Mexican professional wrestler
Aramis Alvarez Pedraza, Cuban chess grandmaster
Aramis Ayala, American lawyer
Aramis Garcia, American baseball player
Aramis Haywood, Panamanian footballer
Aramis Knight, American actor
Aramis Kouzine, Canadian footballer
Aramis Naglić, Croatian basketball player
Aramis Ramírez, Dominican baseball player
Aramis Sartorio, real name of adult film actor Tommy Pistol

See also
Henri d'Aramitz